Paul Leslie Moorcraft (born 1948 in Cardiff, Wales) is the Director of the Centre for Foreign Policy Analysis in London and a visiting professor at Cardiff University's School of Journalism, Media and Cultural Studies.

Biography

Personal life
Moorcraft was born in 1948 in Cardiff, Wales. He attended Cantonian High School in Cardiff, and then Swansea University, University of Lancaster and Cardiff University. Moorcraft later studied at universities in the Middle East and in Southern Africa, including the (University of South Africa and the University of Harare).

Moorcraft married Susan van den Brink in 1987 on an island situated in Zimbabwe's Lake Kariba. In his memoirs, he said it happened "almost by accident". The marriage was dissolved in 1993. Moorcraft now lives in the Surrey Hills, near Guildford in the United Kingdom.

Career
Moorcraft has been the Director of the Centre for Foreign Policy Analysis since its establishment in 2004. It is an independent non-political organisation dedicated to conflict resolution. It has been active in various countries, but especially Sudan. The centre sent fifty observers for the 2010 national elections in both north and south Sudan.

In the course of his academic career Moorcraft taught full-time at the University of Zimbabwe, University of KwaZulu-Natal, University of Cape Town, University of the Witwatersrand, Cardiff MCC University, Baylor University, Deakin University, University of Waikato and Bournemouth University, as well as lecturing part-time at the Open University and University of Westminster. His subjects ranged from international politics to journalism.

Moorcraft has also worked for the British defence establishment. He is a former senior instructor at the Royal Military Academy, Sandhurst (1973–1975), and has also taught at the UK Joint Services Command and Staff College (1997–2000). Moorcraft also worked in corporate communications in the British Ministry of Defence in Whitehall. The Ministry of Defence recalled him for six months during the Iraq War in 2003.

Moorcraft has also pursued a career as a journalist. He was the editor of a range of security and foreign policy magazines, including Defence Review and Defence International. He worked for Time magazine, the BBC and most of the Western TV networks as a freelance producer and war correspondent. Moorcraft was a Distinguished Radford Visiting Professor in Journalism at Baylor University, Texas. Over the past three decades, he has worked in thirty war zones in Africa, the Middle East, Asia and the Balkans, often with irregular forces.

Moorcraft is also a crisis management consultant to such international blue-chip companies as Shell Oil, British Gas, 3M Corporation, Standard Bank etc., as well as for various government organisations.

He is the author of a range of books on military history, politics and crimes. Moorcraft is a media commentator and appears regularly on BBC TV and radio, as well as organizations such as Sky and Al Jazeera. He is also an op-ed/columnist for major international newspapers including The Guardian, Washington Times, Business Day, New Statesman and Western Mail. Moorcraft is a novelist, best known for his Anchoress of Shere (Poisoned Pen Press, 2002).

He lost some eyesight in one eye as a result of previous war injuries, and in 2009 lost the sight in his good eye after surgery to remove a brain tumour.

Moorcraft takes an active interest in raising awareness of dyscalculia in children.

Criticism
Moorcraft conducted one of the first major interviews with Robert Mugabe at the end of the Rhodesia War. Although initially praising the latter for a conciliatory attitude towards white Rhodesians in the new Zimbabwe, he would later become a harsh critic of the Mugabe regime.

Moorcraft also supported the war against Saddam Hussein in 2003, but later recanted his views in the light of the failure to find weapons of mass destruction. In 2006, he supported a total withdrawal of Western forces from Muslim countries, according to Sunday Express.

In April 2008, Moorcraft's views on church law and marriage, more specifically criticising the phenomenon of "wedding tourism", which involves couples seeking to be married in pretty rural parish churches with which they have no real connection, were heavily publicized in print, radio and TV in the UK.

References

Further reading 
Autobiographical Guns and Poses: Travels with an occasional war correspondent (2001).
"Inside Saddam's crazy capital", Western Mail, 3 October 2002.
"A replay of Iraq beckons in Darfur if we send in troops", The Guardian, 6 April 2006.
"The Mugabe problem", Washington Times, 25 August 2006.
"Visions of war, dreams of peace in a changing world", Business Day, 9 January 2007.
1999 Vauxhall Lecture
Number blindness (dyscalculia)
"Why the West must exit now", Sunday Express (London), 17 September 2006.
Church marriage rules
 Cardiff School of Journalism, Media and Cultural Studies
 Channel 56
 Sudan Watch
 International Institute for Strategic Studies
 Inside the Danger Zones: Travels to Arresting Places (Dialogue, London, 2010) p. 195.
 In 2005 he co-authored Axis of Evil: The War on Terror (Pen and Sword, May 2005). An updated version, The New Wars of the West, was published by Casemate in the US in 2006. His Shooting the Messenger: The Political Impact of War Reporting (Potomac, Washington, 2008), is co-authored with Philip M Taylor. The Rhodesian War: A Military History, a study of the Rhodesian civil war (with Peter McLaughlin) was also published in 2008 by Pen and Sword books.
 Poisoned Pen Press, Anchoress of Shere was runner up in 2003 for the Benjamin Franklin Awards, and the Foreword Magazine Book of the Year. It was also named "2002 notable mystery of the year" by the US Publishers Weekly. ‘'Publishers Weekly'’, 1 April 2002, . p57.

External links
Centre for Foreign Policy Analysis

1948 births
Living people
Alumni of Cardiff University
Academics of Cardiff University
University of Pretoria alumni